Sir Robert Napier, 1st Baronet (1560 – 22 April 1637), of Luton Hoo in Bedfordshire, also referred to as Robert Sandy, was an English merchant.

Origins
He was the second son of Alexander Napier (alias Sandy) of Exeter, Devon, by his wife Anne Birchley, daughter of Edward Birchley of Hertfordshire. Alexander was a son of Sir Alexander Napier of Scotland, and was a brother of Sir Archibald Napier. He had left Scotland during the reign of King Henry VIII (1509–1547) and settled in the city of Exeter.  The Napier family claimed descent from the Scottish Earls of Lennox.  Sir Robert's younger brother was Rev. Richard Napier (1559–1634), a noted astrologer and Rector of Linford, Buckinghamshire. The arms of Napier of Luton Hoo were: Argent, a saltire engrailed between four roses (cinquefoils) gules.

Career
He lived in Bishopsgate Street in the City of London, was a member of the Grocers' Company and was a Turkey Merchant, and through trade with Turkey amassed a fortune and purchased the estate of Luton Hoo in Bedfordshire. He was knighted in 1611 during the progress from Scotland through England of King James I, who subsequently created him a baronet "of Luton Hoo" on 25 November 1612. He served as High Sheriff of Bedfordshire in 1611. In 1613 he was elected Sheriff of London but declined to serve, for which he was fined 400 marks.

Marriages and children
He married three times:
Firstly to Elizabeth Staper, without children
Secondly to Margaret Barnes, daughter of Richard Barnes, a Citizen of the City of London and member of the Worshipful Company of Mercers, without children.
Thirdly to Mary Robinson, daughter of John Robinson, merchant, by whom he had three sons and four daughters as follows:
Sir Robert Napier, 2nd Baronet (c.1603 –1661), eldest son and heir.
Sir Richard Napier of Linford
Alexander Napier
Mary Napier, wife of General Sir Thomas Myddelton (1586 –1666) of Chirk Castle, Wales, a Parliamentarian commander during the Civil War.
Christiana Napier, wife of Sir Thomas Eversfield of Sussex.
Sarah Napier, wife of Sir Walter Leach (1599-pre-1637) of Cadeleigh, Devon, son and heir of Sir Simon Leach (1567–1638) of Cadeleigh, Sheriff of Devon in 1624. Her kneeling effigy survives on her father-in-law's large monument in Cadeleigh Church, the largest of its kind in Devon.
Margaret Napier, wife of General Thomas Mytton (c.1597 –1656) of Halston, Shropshire, a Parliamentarian commander during the Civil War.

References

Sources
 
 Dictionary of National Biography
 Burke's Extinct and Dormant Baronetcies (2nd edition, London: John Russell Smith, 1844)

1637 deaths
1560 births
Baronets in the Baronetage of England
Robert, 1st Baronet
High Sheriffs of Bedfordshire
People from Luton
16th-century English people
17th-century English nobility